NY-LON is a 2004 British drama series that aired on Channel 4 in the United Kingdom. The series was created and written by Simon Burke and Anya Camilleri, and starred Rashida Jones and Stephen Moyer. NY-LON was also broadcast on BBC America in the United States.

Synopsis
The series chronicles the transatlantic romance between Edie Miller (Rashida Jones), who is from New York City and Michael Antonioni (Stephen Moyer), who is from London. NY-LON is the first British drama filmed in both London and New York City. The scenes in New York City were filmed in the neighborhoods of the Lower East Side and East Village.

Characters
 Edie Miller (Rashida Jones)
 Michael Antonioni (Stephen Moyer)
 Katherine Williams Osgood (Christine Adams)
 Astrid (Rachel Miner)
 Luke (David Rogers)
 Lauren Antonioni (Emily Corrie)
 Raph (Navin Chowdhry)

Episodes
 "Something about Chemicals"
 "Something about Baggage"
 "Something about Commitment"
 "Something about Honesty"
 "Something about Family"
 "Something about Friends"
 "Something about Love"

American adaptation
In March 2008, CBS announced plans to remake the series for American audiences, with Elisha Cuthbert taking a starring role, but CBS did not move forward with producing a series.

References

External links
NY-LON at Channel4.com
NY-LON at BBC America.com
 

2004 British television series debuts
2004 British television series endings
2000s British drama television series
2000s British romance television series
2000s romantic drama television series
British romantic drama television series
Channel 4 original programming
English-language television shows
Television series about couples
Television shows set in London
Television shows set in New York City
Television series by Banijay